Patti Kusturok (Lamoureux) is a Canadian fiddler, performer, teacher, and composer who is known as "Canada's old-time fiddling sweetheart." She resides in Winnipeg, Manitoba where she teaches fiddling. She performs frequently in addition to teaching at workshops and music camps each summer. She has taught at the Emma Lake Fiddle Camp, Shivering Strings Fiddle Camp in Winnipeg, and Falcon Lake Fiddle Camp. Her son, Alex Kusturok is also a champion fiddler.

Kusturok began playing fiddle at age four according to the Suzuki Method. Her playing is characterized by a pulsating, rhythmical lilt and often referred to as one of the "smoothest fiddle players in North America." Patti has attributed her playing style to having a loose bowing wrist and allowing her fingers to move on the bow as she is playing. Her style is described as part Métis and part Québecois. Her musical influences include Calvin Vollrath, Reg Bouvette and Graham Townsend. Lamoureux explained to CBC SCENE host Bruce Ladan (CBC Manitoba) that she has learned a lot about playing the fiddle by teaching it. After she mastered the instrument, she started teaching when she was 16 years old, taking over for her teacher when he retired. "Being kind of a natural player and not having trouble learning, it was great to learn that other people don't always learn that way," she recalled. "So I learned how to teach by teaching. People would ask me why my bowing arm was so smooth. I had to analyze how I gripped it, as well as the pressure, that kind of thing."

In 2015 she published 365 videos of herself playing a new fiddle tune every day in an event called "Patti Kusturok's 365 Days of Fiddle Tunes." In 2019, Kusturok published an additional 365 videos of herself playing a new fiddle tune every day in an event titled "2019-Patti Kusturok's 365 Days of Fiddle Tunes."

Awards 
 Canadian Junior Fiddle Champion (1985)
 3 time Champion at the Pembroke, ON fiddle competition
 6 time Manitoba Fiddle Champion
 3 time Grand North American Champion
 Canadian Grand Masters Fiddling Championship in Ottawa, ON (1994, 1995, 1996). Kusturok was the first woman in the history of Canada to win the Canadian Grand Masters Fiddling Championship and the very first winner from Western Canada.
 Induction into the Manitoba Fiddle Association Hall of Fame (2010)
 Induction into the North American Fiddlers' Hall of Fame (July 31, 2016)

Albums

References

External links 
 https://www.pattikusturok.com/home
 https://www.youtube.com/channel/UCz_VvZXL8thkEjlTMtcvrOg
 https://soundcloud.com/pattikusturok

Canadian women violinists and fiddlers
Living people
Musicians from Winnipeg
21st-century Canadian violinists and fiddlers
Canadian composers
Year of birth missing (living people)
20th-century Canadian violinists and fiddlers
Canadian women composers
Canadian folk fiddlers